Olbram Zoubek (21 April 1926 – 15 June 2017) was a contemporary Czech sculptor and designer. His work was inspired by Swiss-Italian sculptor Alberto Giacometti.

There is an extensive permanent exhibition of his sculptures and art in Litomyšl Castle Vault Gallery.

Zoubek was particularly well known for having taken a death mask of Jan Palach, a Charles University student who burned himself to death in protest over the 1968 Soviet invasion of Czechoslovakia.  One of his most famous works is his "Memorial to the Victims of Communism" in Prague (done in collaboration with the architects Jan Kerel and Zdeněk Holzel).

Gallery

References

External links

 Biography
 Selection of Works

1926 births
2017 deaths
Artists from Prague
Czech sculptors
Czech male sculptors
Recipients of Medal of Merit (Czech Republic)